Antônio José da Silva Fagundes Filho (born 18 April 1949) is a Brazilian actor, playwright, voice actor, and producer. Renowned for his several performances in stage, film and television, where he frequently works in telenovelas.

Biography
Fagundes was born in the city of Rio de Janeiro but moved with his parents to São Paulo at the age of eight and has lived there for over 30 years. He discovered his gift for the theater from the setting of stage plays made in the Rio Branco School, where he studied. He debuted on television in 1969 on the soap opera Nenhum Homem é Deus, at TV Tupi. Fagundes began on Rede Globo in 1976, on the telenovela Saramandaia. He also served for several years as protagonist of the series Carga Pesada, from 1979 to 1981, and from 2003 to 2007. The actor has four children: one (Bruno Fagundes), with his ex-wife Mara Carvalho, the other three (Dinah Abujamra Fagundes, Antonio Fagundes Neto and Diana Fagundes Abujamra), fruits of his 15-year marriage to actress Clarisse Abujamra.

Career

Television

Stage 

 1964 - A ceia dos cardeais
 1966 - Atlantic's queen
 1969 - Hair (musical), by Gerome Ragni and James Rado
 1969 - "O Cão Siamês"
 Arena canta Tiradentes, by Augusto Boal and Gianfrancesco Guarnieri
 Feira paulista de opinião
 A resistível ascensão de Arturo Ui
 Castro Alves pede passagem
 1975 - "Muro de Arrimo", Antonio Abujamra
 1980 - Pelo telefone
 1981 - "O Homem Elefante", de Bernard Pomerance
 1982 - "Morte Acidental de um Anarquista", by Dario Fo
 1983 - "Xandu Quaresma", de Chico de Assis
 1985 - Cyrano de Bergerac, by Edmond Rostand, direction of Flavio Rangel
 1986 - Carmen com filtro, direção de Gerald Thomas
 1988 - Fragmentos de um discurso amoroso, de Roland Brthes, direction de Ulisses Cruz
 1989 - "O País dos Elefantes", de Louis Charles Sirjacq 
 1990 - "Muro de Arrimo"
 1990 - "História do Soldado", de Gerome Ragni e James Rado
 1992 - Macbeth
 1994 - Vida privada, de Mara Carvalho
 1996 - Oleanna, by David Mamet
 1999 - Últimas luas, by Furio Bordon, direction of Jorge Takla
 2002 - Sete minutos, of his authorship, direction of  Bibi Ferreira
 2005 - As Mulheres da Minha Vida
 2008 - Restos
 2012 - " Vermelho ", by John Logan, direction of Jorge Takla (w/Bruno Fagundes)

Film 

 1967 - Sandra, Sandra
 1969 - A Compadecida
 1971 - Eterna Esperança
 1975 - A Noite das Fêmeas
 1975 - Eu Faço... Elas Sentem
 1976 - Elas São do Baralho
 1977 - Vida Vida
 1978 - A Noite dos Duros
 1978 - Doramundo
 1979 - O Menino Arco-Íris ... proprietário do casebre 
 1979 - Gaijin – Os Caminhos da Liberdade
 1980 - Os Sete Gatinhos
 1981 - Pra Frente, Brasil
 1982 - Tchau, Amor
 1982 - As Aventuras de Mário Fofoca
 1982 - Das Tripas Coração
 1982 - Carícias Eróticas
 1983 - A Próxima Vítima
 1983 - O Menino Arco-Íris
 1985 - Jogo Duro
 1986 - Besame Mucho
 1986 - Anjos da Noite
 1987 - Eternamente Pagú
 1987 - A Dama do Cine Shanghai
 1987 - Leila Diniz
 1988 - Barbosa
 1989 - O Corpo
 1992 - Beijo 2348/72
 1993 - Era Uma Vez no Tibet
 1996 - Doces Poderes
 1998 - Uma História de Futebol 
 1998 - Fica Comigo
 1999 - No Coração dos Deuses
 1999 - O Tronco
 1999 - Paixão Perdida
 2000 - The Grinch (voice acting)
 2000 - Bossa nova
 2000 - Villa-Lobos - Uma Vida de Paixão
 2003 - Sete Minutos
 2003 - Deus É Brasileiro
 2004 - A Dona da História
 2005 - La Marche de l'Empereur (voice acting)
 2005 - Achados e Perdidos
 2013 - Quando Eu Era Vivo
 2014 - Alemão

Awards and nominations

 1985 - Molière Award, best drama actor for Cyrano de Bergerac.
 1988 - Rio Cine Festival, Best Actor (film) by The Lady from the Shanghai Cinema
 1988 - Molière Award, best drama actor for Fragments of a Loving Speech.
 1991 - Press Trophy, best TV actor for The World Owner.
 1992 - Festival Internacional del Cine (Cartagena de las Indias), best film actor for The Body.
 1993 - APCA Trophy, best TV actor for Renascer.
 1993 - Press Trophy, best TV actor for Renascer.
 1997 - Contigo Award! - Best TV actor for For Love '.
 1999 - Award of the Culture House in Rome theater
 1999 - Brazil Quality Award, Best Actor of theater and television for the body of work.
 1999 - APCA Trophy, best drama actor for Latest Luas.
 2000 - Trophy Super Cap de Ouro, TV Terra Nostra.
 2001 - Quality Award Brazil, RJ - best TV actor for Porto dos Milagres.
 2001 - Quality Award Brazil, SP - best TV actor for Porto dos Milagres.
 2001 - Best of the Year, Domingão Faustão - best TV actor for Porto dos Milagres.
 2001 - Contigo Award! - Best TV actor for Porto dos Milagres.
 2008 - Quality Award Brazil - best TV actor for Two Face.
 2008 - Trophy Super Cap de Ouro, TV Two Faces.
 2012 - Award Applause Brazil Theatre - Best Actor for "Red"

References

External links 

 

1949 births
Living people
Male actors from Rio de Janeiro (city)
Brazilian male film actors
Brazilian male telenovela actors
Brazilian male stage actors
Brazilian agnostics